George Carey (born 1943) is a British documentary filmmaker and television journalist.

Education
Carey was educated at Downside School, a boarding independent school for boys in the village of Stratton-on-the-Fosse in Somerset in South West England, followed by the University of Oxford.

Life and career
As a director/editor at BBC News, Carey is credited with the creation of the Newsnight current affairs programme in 1980, before going on to become Editor of BBC1’s Panorama during the Falklands War. In 1988, he left the BBC to co-found an independent production company with Jenny Barraclough.  In 1997, Barraclough Carey Productions was acquired by Mentorn Films, and Carey became Creative Director of the new entity, now known as Mentorn Media. As well as producing a series of prize-winning documentaries (see below), he secured the contract to produce the BBC’s weekly political discussion programme Question Time, and originated Channel 4’s Unreported World strand. In 2005, he received a Lifetime Achievement Award from the Royal Television Society. In 2007, he returned to filmmaking himself, with a five part BBC series on Russia presented by Jonathan Dimbleby, before shooting and directing several individual documentaries with producer Teresa Cherfas. These included Close Encounters in Siberia, A Long Weekend with the Son of God – both for Channel 4 – and Knocking on Heaven’s Door, Hitler, Stalin and Mr Jones, The Spy Who Went into the Cold and Masterspy of Moscow: George Blake, all for BBC Storyville.

He served for four years as a board member for Conciliation Resources, an international non-governmental organization, and for two years as Chairman of Trustees of the House of Illustration.

Filmography

Documentary Singles 
Terror in Moscow (Grierson prize)
Babitsky's War (Amnesty International prize)
The Valley (Prix Italia, Golden Nymph Monte Carlo)
The Unforgiving (BAFTA)
Hello Mr President (Peabody Award)
Fall of Saigon
The Killing of Kennedy
Moonlanding
Blood on their Hands
Terror in the Mall

Documentary Series (General) 
Russia - A Journey with Jonathan Dimbleby
Century Road
Testing God (Best Religious programme)
Soul Searching
Redemption Song
Queen and Country
Do you Believe in Magic?
Visions of Heaven and Hell (Golden Spire, San Francisco)
The White House Tapes
The New Jerusalem
The Tunnel
Clintons: A Marriage of Power (Broadcast Award)
Rebellion
Scare Stories
The Crimean War
From Beirut to Bosnia
Planet Islam
The Poisoned Chalice
Mad Cows and Englishmen
Gunpower USA
Men in Battle

Documentary Series (Science) 
The Plague (Royal Television Society Best Series)
Knife to the Heart
Cancer Wars
The Babymakers (BMI Best Medical Series)

BBC Documentary Singles 

Marilyn: Say Goodbye to the President
M.I.A.: We'll Keep You Forever
The Trial of Klaus Barbie
The Search for the Missing Marcos Millions (Emmy Award)
Masterspy of Moscow – George Blake
Hitler, Stalin and Mr Jones

BBC Documentary Series 

An Ocean Apart
Families at War (RTS Award)
Comrades
Frontiers (ACE Award)

References

1943 births
Living people
BBC newsreaders and journalists
People educated at Downside School